Edward VIII (Edward Albert Christian George Andrew Patrick David; 23 June 1894 – 28 May 1972), later known as the Duke of Windsor, was King of the United Kingdom and the Dominions of the British Empire and Emperor of India from 20 January 1936 until his abdication in December of the same year.

Edward was born during the reign of his great-grandmother Queen Victoria as the eldest child of the Duke and Duchess of York, later King George V and Queen Mary. He was created Prince of Wales on his 16th birthday, seven weeks after his father succeeded as king. As a young man, Edward served in the British Army during the First World War and undertook several overseas tours on behalf of his father. While Prince of Wales, he engaged in a series of sexual affairs that worried both his father and then-British prime minister Stanley Baldwin.

Upon his father's death in 1936, Edward became the second monarch of the House of Windsor. The new king showed impatience with court protocol, and caused concern among politicians by his apparent disregard for established constitutional conventions. Only months into his reign, a constitutional crisis was caused by his proposal to marry Wallis Simpson, an American who had divorced her first husband and was seeking a divorce from her second. The prime ministers of the United Kingdom and the Dominions opposed the marriage, arguing a divorced woman with two living ex-husbands was politically and socially unacceptable as a prospective queen consort. Additionally, such a marriage would have conflicted with Edward's status as titular head of the Church of England, which, at the time, disapproved of remarriage after divorce if a former spouse was still alive. Edward knew the Baldwin government would resign if the marriage went ahead, which could have forced a general election and would have ruined his status as a politically neutral constitutional monarch. When it became apparent he could not marry Simpson and remain on the throne, he abdicated. He was succeeded by his younger brother, George VI. With a reign of 326 days, Edward was one of the shortest-reigning British monarchs to date.

After his abdication, Edward was created Duke of Windsor. He married Simpson in France on 3 June 1937, after her second divorce became final. Later that year, the couple toured Nazi Germany, which fed rumours that he was a Nazi sympathiser. During the Second World War, Edward was at first stationed with the British Military Mission to France but after the fall of France was appointed Governor of the Bahamas. After the war, Edward spent the rest of his life in France. He and Wallis remained married until his death in 1972; they had no children.

Early life 

Edward was born on 23 June 1894 at White Lodge, Richmond Park, on the outskirts of London during the reign of his great-grandmother Queen Victoria. He was the eldest son of the Duke and Duchess of York (later King George V and Queen Mary). His father was the son of the Prince and Princess of Wales (later King Edward VII and Queen Alexandra). His mother was the eldest daughter of Princess Mary Adelaide of Cambridge and Francis, Duke of Teck. At the time of his birth, he was third in the line of succession to the throne, behind his grandfather and father.

Edward was baptised Edward Albert Christian George Andrew Patrick David in the Green Drawing Room of White Lodge on 16 July 1894 by Edward White Benson, Archbishop of Canterbury. The name "Edward" was chosen in honour of Edward's late uncle Prince Albert Victor, Duke of Clarence and Avondale, who was known within the family as "Eddy" (Edward being among his given names); "Albert" was included at the behest of Queen Victoria for her late husband Albert, Prince Consort; "Christian" was in honour of his great-grandfather King Christian IX of Denmark; and the last four names – George, Andrew, Patrick and David – came from, respectively, the patron saints of England, Scotland, Ireland and Wales. He was always known to his family and close friends by his last given name, David.

As was common practice with upper-class children of the time, Edward and his younger siblings were brought up by nannies rather than directly by their parents. One of Edward's early nannies often abused him by pinching him before he was due to be presented to his parents. His subsequent crying and wailing would lead the Duke and Duchess to send him and the nanny away. The nanny was discharged after her mistreatment of the children was discovered, and she was replaced by Charlotte Bill.

Edward's father, though a harsh disciplinarian, was demonstratively affectionate, and his mother displayed a frolicsome side with her children that belied her austere public image. She was amused by the children making tadpoles on toast for their French master as a prank, and encouraged them to confide in her.

Education 

Initially, Edward was tutored at home by Hélène Bricka. When his parents travelled the British Empire for almost nine months following the death of Queen Victoria in 1901, young Edward and his siblings stayed in Britain with their grandparents, Queen Alexandra and King Edward VII, who showered their grandchildren with affection. Upon his parents' return, Edward was placed under the care of two men, Frederick Finch and Henry Hansell, who virtually brought up Edward and his siblings for their remaining nursery years.

Edward was kept under the strict tutorship of Hansell until almost thirteen years old. Private tutors taught him German and French. Edward took the examination to enter the Royal Naval College, Osborne, and began there in 1907. Hansell had wanted Edward to enter school earlier, but the prince's father had disagreed. Following two years at Osborne College, which he did not enjoy, Edward moved on to the Royal Naval College at Dartmouth. A course of two years, followed by entry into the Royal Navy, was planned.

Edward automatically became Duke of Cornwall and Duke of Rothesay on 6 May 1910 when his father ascended the throne as George V on the death of Edward VII. He was created Prince of Wales and Earl of Chester a month later on 23 June 1910, his 16th birthday. Preparations for his future as king began in earnest. He was withdrawn from his naval course before his formal graduation, served as midshipman for three months aboard the battleship Hindustan, then immediately entered Magdalen College, Oxford, for which, in the opinion of his biographers, he was underprepared intellectually. A keen horseman, he learned how to play polo with the university club. He left Oxford after eight terms, without any academic qualifications.

Prince of Wales
Edward was officially invested as Prince of Wales in a special ceremony at Caernarfon Castle on 13 July 1911. The investiture took place in Wales, at the instigation of the Welsh politician David Lloyd George, Constable of the Castle and Chancellor of the Exchequer in the Liberal government. Lloyd George invented a rather fanciful ceremony in the style of a Welsh pageant, and coached Edward to speak a few words in Welsh.

When the First World War broke out in 1914, Edward had reached the minimum age for active service and was keen to participate. He had joined the Grenadier Guards in June 1914, and although Edward was willing to serve on the front lines, Secretary of State for War Lord Kitchener refused to allow it, citing the immense harm that would occur if the heir apparent to the throne were captured by the enemy. Despite this, Edward witnessed trench warfare first-hand and visited the front line as often as he could, for which he was awarded the Military Cross in 1916. His role in the war, although limited, made him popular among veterans of the conflict. He undertook his first military flight in 1918, and later gained a pilot's licence.

Edward's youngest brother, Prince John, died at the age of 13 on 18 January 1919 after a severe epileptic seizure. Edward, who was 11 years older than John and had hardly known him, saw his death as "little more than a regrettable nuisance". He wrote to his mistress of the time that "[he had] told [her] all about that little brother, and how he was an epileptic. [John]'s been practically shut up for the last two years anyhow, so no one has ever seen him except the family, and then only once or twice a year. This poor boy had become more of an animal than anything else." He also wrote an insensitive letter to his mother which has since been lost. She did not reply, but he felt compelled to write her an apology, in which he stated: "I feel such a cold hearted and unsympathetic swine for writing all that I did ... No one can realize more than you how little poor Johnnie meant to me who hardly knew him ... I feel so much for you, darling Mama, who was his mother."

Throughout the 1920s, Edward, as Prince of Wales, represented his father at home and abroad on many occasions. His rank, travels, good looks, and unmarried status gained him much public attention. At the height of his popularity, he was the most photographed celebrity of his time and he set men's fashion. During his 1924 visit to the United States, Men's Wear magazine observed, "The average young man in America is more interested in the clothes of the Prince of Wales than in any other individual on earth."

Edward visited poverty-stricken areas of Britain, and undertook 16 tours to various parts of the Empire between 1919 and 1935. On a tour of Canada in 1919, he acquired the Bedingfield ranch, near Pekisko, Alberta. He escaped unharmed when the train he was riding in during a tour of Australia was derailed outside Perth in 1920. 

Edward's November 1921 visit to India came during the non-cooperation movement protests for Indian self-rule, and was marked by riots in Bombay. In 1929 Sir Alexander Leith, a leading Conservative in the north of England, persuaded him to make a three-day visit to the County Durham and Northumberland coalfields, where there was much unemployment. From January to April 1931, the Prince of Wales and his brother Prince George travelled  on a tour of South America, steaming out on the ocean liner , and returning via Paris and an Imperial Airways flight from Paris–Le Bourget Airport that landed specially in Windsor Great Park.

Though widely travelled, Edward shared a widely held racial prejudice against foreigners and many of the Empire's subjects, believing that whites were inherently superior. In 1920, on his visit to Australia, he wrote of Indigenous Australians: "they are the most revolting form of living creatures I've ever seen!! They are the lowest known form of human beings & are the nearest thing to monkeys."

In 1919, Edward agreed to be president of the organising committee for the proposed British Empire Exhibition at Wembley Park, Middlesex. He wished the Exhibition to include "a great national sports ground", and so played a part in the creation of Wembley Stadium.

Romances 
Before the First World War, a royal match with his second cousin, Princess Victoria Louise of Prussia, was suggested. Nothing came of it, and Victoria Louise married Edward's first cousin once removed Ernest Augustus, Duke of Brunswick, instead. In 1934, Adolf Hitler, in his ambition to link the British and German royal houses, asked Princess Victoria Louise to arrange a marriage between the 40-year-old Edward and her 17-year-old daughter, Frederica of Hanover, who was at boarding school in England. Her parents refused, due to the age gap, and Frederica instead married Paul of Greece.

By 1917, Edward liked to spend time partying in Paris while he was on leave from his regiment on the Western Front. He was introduced to Parisian courtesan Marguerite Alibert, with whom he became infatuated. He wrote her candid letters, which she kept. After about a year, Edward broke off the affair. In 1923, Alibert was acquitted in a spectacular murder trial after she shot her husband in the Savoy Hotel. Desperate efforts were made by the Royal Household to ensure that Edward's name was not mentioned in connection with the trial or Alibert.

Edward's womanising and reckless behaviour during the 1920s and 1930s worried Prime Minister Stanley Baldwin, King George V, and those close to the prince. George V was disappointed by his son's failure to settle down in life, disgusted by his affairs with married women, and reluctant to see him inherit the Crown. "After I am dead," George said, "the boy will ruin himself in twelve months."

George V favoured his second son Albert ("Bertie") and Albert's daughter Elizabeth ("Lilibet"), later King George VI and Queen Elizabeth II respectively. He told a courtier, "I pray to God that my eldest son will never marry and have children, and that nothing will come between Bertie and Lilibet and the throne." In 1929, Time magazine reported that Edward teased Albert's wife, also named Elizabeth (later the Queen Mother), by calling her "Queen Elizabeth". The magazine asked if "she did not sometimes wonder how much truth there is in the story that he once said he would renounce his rights upon the death of George V – which would make her nickname come true".

In 1930, George V gave Edward the lease of Fort Belvedere in Windsor Great Park. There, he continued his relationships with a series of married women, including Freda Dudley Ward and Lady Furness, the American wife of a British peer, who introduced the prince to her friend and fellow American Wallis Simpson. Simpson had divorced her first husband, U.S. Navy officer Win Spencer, in 1927. Her second husband, Ernest Simpson, was a British-American businessman. Wallis Simpson and the Prince of Wales, it is generally accepted, became lovers, while Lady Furness travelled abroad, although the prince adamantly insisted to his father that he was not having an affair with her and that it was not appropriate to describe her as his mistress. Edward's relationship with Simpson, however, further weakened his poor relationship with his father. Although his parents met Simpson at Buckingham Palace in 1935, they later refused to receive her.

Edward's affair with an American divorcée led to such grave concern that the couple were followed by members of the Metropolitan Police Special Branch, who examined in secret the nature of their relationship. An undated report detailed a visit by the couple to an antique shop, where the proprietor later noted "that the lady seemed to have POW [Prince of Wales] completely under her thumb." The prospect of having an American divorcée with a questionable past having such sway over the heir apparent led to anxiety among government and establishment figures.

Reign 

George V died on 20 January 1936, and Edward ascended the throne as Edward VIII. The next day, accompanied by Simpson, he broke with custom by watching the proclamation of his own accession from a window of St James's Palace. He became the first monarch of the British Empire to fly in an aircraft when he flew from Sandringham to London for his Accession Council.

Edward caused unease in government circles with actions that were interpreted as interference in political matters. His comment during a tour of depressed villages in South Wales that "something must be done" for the unemployed coal miners was seen as an attempt to guide government policy, though he had not proposed any remedy or change in policy. Government ministers were reluctant to send confidential documents and state papers to Fort Belvedere, because it was clear that Edward was paying little attention to them, and it was feared that Simpson and other house guests might read them, improperly or inadvertently revealing government secrets.

Edward's unorthodox approach to his role also extended to the coinage that bore his image. He broke with the tradition that the profile portrait of each successive monarch faced in the direction opposite to that of his or her predecessor. Edward insisted that he face left (as his father had done), to show the parting in his hair. Only a handful of test coins were struck before the abdication, and all are very rare. When George VI succeeded to the throne he also faced left to maintain the tradition by suggesting that, had any further coins been minted featuring Edward's portrait, they would have shown him facing right.

On 16 July 1936, George Andrew McMahon produced a loaded revolver as Edward rode on horseback at Constitution Hill, near Buckingham Palace. Police spotted the gun and pounced on him; he was quickly arrested. McMahon alleged at his trial that "a foreign power" had approached him to kill Edward, that he had informed MI5 of the plan, and that he was merely seeing the plan through to help MI5 catch the real culprits. The court rejected the claims and sent him to jail for a year for "intent to alarm". It is now thought that McMahon had indeed been in contact with MI5, but the veracity of the remainder of his claims remains debatable.

In August and September, Edward and Simpson cruised the Eastern Mediterranean on the steam yacht Nahlin. By October it was becoming clear that the new king planned to marry Simpson, especially when divorce proceedings between the Simpsons were brought at Ipswich Assizes. Although gossip about his affair was widespread in the United States, the British media kept silent voluntarily, and the general public knew nothing until early December.

Abdication 

On 16 November 1936, Edward invited Prime Minister Stanley Baldwin to Buckingham Palace and expressed his desire to marry Simpson when she became free to remarry. Baldwin informed him that his subjects would deem the marriage morally unacceptable, largely because remarriage after divorce was opposed by the Church of England, and the people would not tolerate Simpson as queen. As king, Edward was the titular head of the Church, and the clergy expected him to support the Church's teachings. The Archbishop of Canterbury, Cosmo Gordon Lang, was vocal in insisting that Edward must go.

Edward proposed an alternative solution of a morganatic marriage, in which he would remain king but Simpson would not become queen consort. She would enjoy some lesser title instead, and any children they might have would not inherit the throne. This was supported by senior politician Winston Churchill in principle, and some historians suggest that he conceived the plan. In any event, it was ultimately rejected by the British Cabinet as well as other Dominion governments. The other governments' views were sought pursuant to the Statute of Westminster 1931, which provided in part that "any alteration in the law touching the Succession to the Throne or the Royal Style and Titles shall hereafter require the assent as well of the Parliaments of all the Dominions as of the Parliament of the United Kingdom." The Prime Ministers of Australia (Joseph Lyons), Canada (Mackenzie King) and South Africa (J. B. M. Hertzog) made clear their opposition to the King marrying a divorcée; their Irish counterpart (Éamon de Valera) expressed indifference and detachment, while the Prime Minister of New Zealand (Michael Joseph Savage), having never heard of Simpson before, vacillated in disbelief. Faced with this opposition, Edward at first responded that there were "not many people in Australia" and their opinion did not matter.

Edward informed Baldwin that he would abdicate if he could not marry Simpson. Baldwin then presented Edward with three options: give up the idea of marriage; marry against his ministers' wishes; or abdicate. It was clear that Edward was not prepared to give up Simpson, and he knew that if he married against the advice of his ministers, he would cause the government to resign, prompting a constitutional crisis. He chose to abdicate.

Edward duly signed the instruments of abdication at Fort Belvedere on 10 December 1936 in the presence of his younger brothers: Prince Albert, Duke of York, next in line for the throne; Prince Henry, Duke of Gloucester; and Prince George, Duke of Kent. The document included these words: "declare my irrevocable determination to renounce the throne for myself and for my descendants and my desire that effect should be given to this instrument of abdication immediately". The next day, the last act of his reign was the royal assent to His Majesty's Declaration of Abdication Act 1936. As required by the Statute of Westminster, all the Dominions had already consented to the abdication.

On the night of 11 December 1936, Edward, now reverted to the title and style of a prince, explained his decision to abdicate in a worldwide BBC radio broadcast. He said, "I have found it impossible to carry the heavy burden of responsibility and to discharge my duties as king as I would wish to do without the help and support of the woman I love." He added that the "decision was mine and mine alone ... The other person most nearly concerned has tried up to the last to persuade me to take a different course". Edward departed Britain for Austria the following day; he was unable to join Simpson until her divorce became absolute, several months later. The Duke of York succeeded to the throne as George VI. Accordingly, George VI's elder daughter, Princess Elizabeth, became heir presumptive.

Duke of Windsor 
On 12 December 1936, at the accession meeting of the British Privy Council, George VI announced his intention to make his brother the "Duke of Windsor" with the style of Royal Highness. He wanted this to be the first act of his reign, although the formal documents were not signed until 8 March the following year. During the interim, Edward was known as the Duke of Windsor. George VI's decision to create Edward a royal duke ensured that he could neither stand for election to the British House of Commons nor speak on political subjects in the House of Lords.

Letters Patent dated 27 May 1937 re-conferred the "title, style, or attribute of Royal Highness" upon the Duke, but specifically stated that "his wife and descendants, if any, shall not hold said title or attribute". Some British ministers advised that the reconfirmation was unnecessary since Edward had retained the style automatically, and further that Simpson would automatically obtain the rank of wife of a prince with the style Her Royal Highness; others maintained that he had lost all royal rank and should no longer carry any royal title or style as an abdicated king, and be referred to simply as "Mr Edward Windsor". On 14 April 1937, Attorney General Sir Donald Somervell submitted to Home Secretary Sir John Simon a memorandum summarising the views of Lord Advocate T. M. Cooper, Parliamentary Counsel Sir Granville Ram, and himself:

The Duke married Simpson, who had changed her name by deed poll to Wallis Warfield (her birth surname), in a private ceremony on 3 June 1937, at Château de Candé, near Tours, France. When the Church of England refused to sanction the union, a County Durham clergyman, Robert Anderson Jardine (Vicar of St Paul's, Darlington), offered to perform the ceremony, and Edward accepted. George VI forbade members of the royal family to attend, to the lasting resentment of the Duke and Duchess of Windsor. Edward had particularly wanted his brothers the Dukes of Gloucester and Kent and his second cousin Lord Louis Mountbatten to attend the ceremony.

The denial of the style Royal Highness to the Duchess of Windsor caused further conflict, as did the financial settlement. The Government declined to include the Duke or Duchess on the Civil List, and the Duke's allowance was paid personally by George VI. Edward compromised his position with his brother by concealing the extent of his financial worth when they informally agreed on the amount of the allowance. Edward's wealth had accumulated from the revenues of the Duchy of Cornwall paid to him as Prince of Wales and ordinarily at the disposal of an incoming king. George also paid Edward for Sandringham House and Balmoral Castle, which were Edward's personal property, inherited from his father and thus did not automatically pass to George VI on his accession. Edward received approximately £300,000 (equivalent to between £21 million and £140 million in 2021) for both residences which was paid to him in yearly instalments. In the early days of George VI's reign Edward telephoned daily, importuning for money and urging that Wallis be granted the style of Royal Highness, until the harassed king ordered that the calls not be put through.

Relations between the Duke of Windsor and the rest of the royal family were strained for decades. Edward had assumed that he would settle in Britain after a year or two of exile in France. King George VI (with the support of Queen Mary and his wife Queen Elizabeth) threatened to cut off Edward's allowance if he returned to Britain without an invitation. Edward became embittered against his mother, Queen Mary, writing to her in 1939: "[your last letter] destroy[ed] the last vestige of feeling I had left for you ... [and has] made further normal correspondence between us impossible."

In October 1937, the Duke and Duchess visited Nazi Germany, against the advice of the British government, and met Adolf Hitler at his Berghof retreat in Bavaria. The visit was much publicised by the German media. During the visit, Edward gave full Nazi salutes. In Germany, "they were treated like royalty ... members of the aristocracy would bow and curtsy towards her, and she was treated with all the dignity and status that the duke always wanted", according to royal biographer Andrew Morton in a 2016 BBC interview.

The former Austrian ambassador, Count Albert von Mensdorff-Pouilly-Dietrichstein, who was also a second cousin once removed and friend of George V, believed that Edward favoured German fascism as a bulwark against communism, and even that he initially favoured an alliance with Germany. According to the Duke of Windsor, the experience of "the unending scenes of horror" during the First World War led him to support appeasement. Hitler considered Edward to be friendly towards Germany and thought that Anglo-German relations could have been improved through Edward if it were not for the abdication. Albert Speer quoted Hitler directly: "I am certain through him permanent friendly relations could have been achieved. If he had stayed, everything would have been different. His abdication was a severe loss for us."

Second World War 
In May 1939, Edward was commissioned by NBC to give a radio broadcast (his first since abdicating) during a visit to the First World War battlefields of Verdun. In it he appealed for peace, saying "I am deeply conscious of the presence of the great company of the dead, and I am convinced that could they make their voices heard they would be with me in what I am about to say. I speak simply as a soldier of the Last War whose most earnest prayer it is that such cruel and destructive madness shall never again overtake mankind. There is no land whose people want war." The broadcast was heard across the world by millions. It was widely regarded as supporting appeasement, and the BBC refused to broadcast it. It was broadcast outside the United States on shortwave radio and was reported in full by British broadsheet newspapers.
On the outbreak of the Second World War in September 1939, the Duke and Duchess were brought back to Britain by Louis Mountbatten on board HMS Kelly, and Edward, although he held the rank of field marshal, was made a major-general attached to the British Military Mission in France. In February 1940, the German ambassador in The Hague, Count Julius von Zech-Burkersroda, claimed that Edward had leaked the Allied war plans for the defence of Belgium, which the Duke later denied. When Germany invaded the north of France in May 1940, the Windsors fled south, first to Biarritz, then in June to Francoist Spain. In July they moved to Portugal, where they lived at first in the home of Ricardo Espírito Santo, a Portuguese banker with both British and German contacts. Under the code name Operation Willi, Nazi agents, principally Walter Schellenberg, plotted unsuccessfully to persuade the Duke to leave Portugal and return to Spain, kidnapping him if necessary. Lord Caldecote wrote a warning to Winston Churchill, who by this point was prime minister, that "[the Duke] is well-known to be pro-Nazi and he may become a centre of intrigue." Churchill threatened Edward with a court-martial if he did not return to British soil.

In July 1940, Edward was appointed governor of the Bahamas. The Duke and Duchess left Lisbon on 1 August aboard the American Export Lines steamship Excalibur, which was specially diverted from its usual direct course to New York City so that they could be dropped off at Bermuda on the 9th. They left Bermuda for Nassau on the Canadian National Steamship Company vessel Lady Somers on 15 August, arriving two days later. Edward did not enjoy being governor and privately referred to the islands as "a third-class British colony". The British Foreign Office strenuously objected when Edward and Wallis planned to cruise aboard a yacht belonging to Swedish magnate Axel Wenner-Gren, whom British and American intelligence wrongly believed to be a close friend of Luftwaffe commander Hermann Göring. Edward was praised for his efforts to combat poverty on the islands, although he was as contemptuous of the Bahamians as he was of most non-white peoples of the Empire. He said of Étienne Dupuch, the editor of the Nassau Daily Tribune: "It must be remembered that Dupuch is more than half Negro, and due to the peculiar mentality of this Race, they seem unable to rise to prominence without losing their equilibrium." He was praised, even by Dupuch, for his resolution of civil unrest over low wages in Nassau in 1942, even though he blamed the trouble on "mischief makers – communists" and "men of Central European Jewish descent, who had secured jobs as a pretext for obtaining a deferment of draft". He resigned from the post on 16 March 1945.

Many historians have suggested that Adolf Hitler was prepared to reinstate Edward as king in the hope of establishing a fascist puppet government in Britain after Operation Sea Lion. It is widely believed that the Duke and Duchess sympathised with fascism before and during the Second World War, and were moved to the Bahamas to minimise their opportunities to act on those feelings. In 1940 he said: "In the past 10 years Germany has totally reorganised the order of its society ... Countries which were unwilling to accept such a reorganisation of society and its concomitant sacrifices should direct their policies accordingly." During the occupation of France, the Duke asked the German Wehrmacht forces to place guards at his Paris and Riviera homes; they did so. In December 1940, Edward gave Fulton Oursler of Liberty magazine an interview at Government House in Nassau. Oursler conveyed its content to President Franklin D. Roosevelt in a private meeting at the White House on 23 December 1940. The interview was published on 22 March 1941 and in it Edward was reported to have said that "Hitler was the right and logical leader of the German people" and that the time was coming for President Roosevelt to mediate a peace settlement. Edward protested that he had been misquoted and misinterpreted.

The Allies became sufficiently disturbed by German plots revolving around Edward that President Roosevelt ordered covert surveillance of the Duke and Duchess when they visited Palm Beach, Florida, in April 1941. Duke Carl Alexander of Württemberg (then a monk in an American monastery) had told the Federal Bureau of Investigation that Wallis had slept with the German ambassador in London, Joachim von Ribbentrop, in 1936; had remained in constant contact with him; and had continued to leak secrets.

Author Charles Higham claimed that Anthony Blunt, an MI5 agent and Soviet spy, acting on orders from the British royal family, made a successful secret trip to Schloss Friedrichshof in Allied-occupied Germany towards the end of the war to retrieve sensitive letters between the Duke of Windsor and Adolf Hitler and other leading Nazis. What is certain is that George VI sent the Royal Librarian, Owen Morshead, accompanied by Blunt, then working part-time in the Royal Library as well as for British intelligence, to Friedrichshof in March 1945 to secure papers relating to Victoria, German Empress, the eldest child of Queen Victoria. Looters had stolen part of the castle's archive, including surviving letters between daughter and mother, as well as other valuables, some of which were recovered in Chicago after the war. The papers rescued by Morshead and Blunt, and those returned by the American authorities from Chicago, were deposited in the Royal Archives. In the late 1950s, documents recovered by U.S. troops in Marburg, Germany, in May 1945, since titled the Marburg Files, were published following more than a decade of suppression, enhancing theories of Edward's sympathies for Nazi ideologies.

After the war, Edward admitted in his memoirs that he admired the Germans, but he denied being pro-Nazi. Of Hitler he wrote: "[the] Führer struck me as a somewhat ridiculous figure, with his theatrical posturings and his bombastic pretensions." In the 1950s, journalist Frank Giles heard the Duke blame British foreign secretary Anthony Eden for helping to "precipitate the war through his treatment of Mussolini ... that's what [Eden] did, he helped to bring on the war ... and of course Roosevelt and the Jews". During the 1960s Edward said privately to a friend, Patrick Balfour, 3rd Baron Kinross, "I never thought Hitler was such a bad chap."

Later life 

At the end of the war, the couple returned to France and spent the remainder of their lives essentially in retirement as Edward never held another official role. Letters written by Kenneth de Courcy to the Duke, dated between 1946 and 1949, extracts of which were published in 2009, suggest a scheme where Edward would return to England and place himself in a position for a possible regency. The health of George VI was failing and de Courcy was concerned about the influence of the Mountbatten family over the young Princess Elizabeth. De Courcy suggested the Duke buy a working agricultural estate within an easy drive of London in order to gain favour with the British public and make himself available should the King become incapacitated. The Duke, however, hesitated and the King recovered from his surgery.

Edward's allowance was supplemented by government favours and illegal currency trading. The City of Paris provided the Duke with a house at 4 route du Champ d'Entraînement, on the Neuilly-sur-Seine side of the Bois de Boulogne, for a nominal rent. The French government also exempted him from paying income tax, and the couple were able to buy goods duty-free through the British embassy and the military commissary. In 1952, they bought and renovated a weekend country retreat, Le Moulin de la Tuilerie at Gif-sur-Yvette, the only property the couple ever owned themselves. In 1951, Edward produced a memoir, A King's Story ghost-written by Charles Murphy, in which he expressed disagreement with liberal politics. The royalties from the book added to their income.

Edward and Wallis effectively took on the role of celebrities and were regarded as part of café society in the 1950s and 1960s. They hosted parties and shuttled between Paris and New York; Gore Vidal, who met the Windsors socially, reported on the vacuity of the Duke's conversation. The couple doted on the pug dogs they kept.

In June 1953, instead of attending the coronation of Queen Elizabeth II, his niece, in London, Edward and Wallis watched the ceremony on television in Paris. Edward said that it was contrary to precedent for a Sovereign or former Sovereign to attend any coronation of another. He was paid to write articles on the ceremony for the Sunday Express and Woman's Home Companion, as well as a short book, The Crown and the People, 1902–1953.

In 1955, the couple visited President Dwight D. Eisenhower at the White House. The couple appeared on Edward R. Murrow's television-interview show Person to Person in 1956, and in a 50-minute BBC television interview in 1970. On 4 April of that year President Richard Nixon invited them as guests of honour to a dinner at the White House with Chief Justice Warren E. Burger, Charles Lindbergh, Alice Roosevelt Longworth, Arnold Palmer, George H. W. Bush, and Frank Borman.

The royal family never fully accepted the Duchess. Queen Mary refused to receive her formally. However, Edward sometimes met his mother and his brother, George VI; he attended George's funeral in 1952. Mary remained angry with Edward and indignant over his marriage to Wallis: "To give up all this for that", she said. In 1965, the Duke and Duchess returned to London. They were visited by his niece Elizabeth II, his sister-in-law Princess Marina, Duchess of Kent, and his sister Mary, Princess Royal and Countess of Harewood. A week later, the Princess Royal died, and they attended her memorial service.
In 1966 Edward gave the journalist Georg Stefan Troller a TV interview in German; he answered questions about his abdication. In 1967, they joined the royal family for the centenary of Queen Mary's birth. The last royal ceremony Edward attended was the funeral of Princess Marina in 1968. He declined an invitation from Elizabeth II to attend the investiture of Charles, Prince of Wales, in 1969, replying that Charles would not want his "aged great-uncle" there.

In the 1960s, Edward's health deteriorated. Michael E. DeBakey operated on him in Houston for an aneurysm of the abdominal aorta in December 1964, and Sir Stewart Duke-Elder treated a detached retina in his left eye in February 1965. In late 1971, Edward, who was a smoker from an early age, was diagnosed with throat cancer and underwent cobalt therapy. On 18 May 1972, Queen Elizabeth II visited the Duke and Duchess of Windsor while on a state visit to France; she spoke with Edward for fifteen minutes, but only Wallis appeared with the royal party for a photocall as Edward was too ill.

Death and legacy 

On 28 May 1972, ten days after Elizabeth's visit, Edward died at his home in Paris, less than a month before his 78th birthday. His body was returned to Britain, lying in state at St George's Chapel, Windsor Castle. The funeral service took place in the chapel on 5 June in the presence of the Queen, the royal family, and the Duchess of Windsor, who stayed at Buckingham Palace during her visit. He was buried in the Royal Burial Ground behind the Royal Mausoleum of Queen Victoria and Prince Albert at Frogmore. Until a 1965 agreement with the Queen, the Duke and Duchess had planned for a burial in a cemetery plot they had purchased at Green Mount Cemetery in Baltimore, where Wallis's father was interred. Frail, and suffering increasingly from dementia, Wallis died in 1986, and was buried alongside her husband.

In the view of historians, such as Philip Williamson writing in 2007, the popular perception in the 21st century that the abdication was driven by politics rather than religious morality is false and arises because divorce has become much more common and socially acceptable. To modern sensibilities, the religious restrictions that prevented Edward from continuing as king while planning to marry Wallis Simpson "seem, wrongly, to provide insufficient explanation" for his abdication.

Honours and arms

British Commonwealth and Empire honours 

 KG: Royal Knight of the Most Noble Order of the Garter, 23 June 1910
 ISO: Companion of the Imperial Service Order, 23 June 1910
 MC: Military Cross, 3 June 1916
 GCMG: Grand Master and Knight Grand Cross of the Most Distinguished Order of St Michael and St George, 1917
 GBE: Grand Master and Knight Grand Cross of the Most Excellent Order of the British Empire, 1917
 ADC: Personal aide-de-camp, 3 June 1919
 PC: Privy Counsellor of the United Kingdom, 2 March 1920
 GCVO: Knight Grand Cross of the Royal Victorian Order, 13 March 1920
 GCSI: Knight Grand Commander of the Most Exalted Order of the Star of India, 1921
 GCIE: Knight Grand Commander of the Most Eminent Order of the Indian Empire, 1921
 Royal Victorian Chain, 1921
 KT: Extra Knight of the Most Ancient and Most Noble Order of the Thistle, 23 June 1922
 GCStJ: Bailiff Grand Cross of the Venerable Order of St John, 12 June 1926
 KStJ: Knight of Justice of the Most Venerable Order of St John, 2 June 1917
 KP: Extra Knight of the Most Illustrious Order of St Patrick, 3 June 1927
 PC: Privy Councillor of Canada, 2 August 1927
 GCB: Knight Grand Cross of the Most Honourable Order of the Bath, 1936
 FRS: Royal Fellow of the Royal Society

Foreign honours 
 Grand Cross of the House Order of the Wendish Crown, with Crown in Ore, 1 May 1911
  Knight of the Grand Ducal Hessian Order of the Golden Lion, 23 June 1911
  Knight of the Order of the Golden Fleece, 22 June 1912
  Grand Cross of the National Order of the Legion of Honour, August 1912
  Knight of the Order of the Elephant, 17 March 1914
  Grand Cross of the Royal Norwegian Order of St Olav, with Collar, 6 April 1914
  Knight of the Supreme Order of the Most Holy Annunciation, 21 June 1915
  Croix de Guerre, 1915
  Knight of the Order of St George, 3rd Class, 16 May 1916
  Knight of the Order of the Royal House of Chakri, 16 August 1917
  Order of Michael the Brave, 1st Class, 1918
  War Merit Cross, 1919
  Grand Cordon of the Royal Order of Muhammad Ali, 1922
  Knight of the Royal Order of the Seraphim, 12 November 1923
  Collar of the Order of Carol I, 1924
  Order of Merit, 1st Class, 1925
  Grand Cross of the Order of the Condor of the Andes, 1931
  Grand Cross of the Order of the Sun of Peru, 1931
  Grand Cross of the Sash of the Two Orders, 25 April 1931 – during his visit to Lisbon
  Grand Cross of the National Order of the Southern Cross, 1933
  Grand Cross of the Order of St Agatha, 1935

Military ranks 
 22 June 1911: Midshipman, Royal Navy
 17 March 1913: Lieutenant, Royal Navy
 18 November 1914: Lieutenant, 1st Battalion, Grenadier Guards, British Army. (First World War, Flanders and Italy)
 10 March 1916: Captain, British Army
 1918: Temporary Major, British Army
 15 April 1919: Colonel, British Army
 8 July 1919: Captain, Royal Navy
 5 December 1922: Group Captain, Royal Air Force
 1 September 1930: Vice-Admiral, Royal Navy; Lieutenant-General, British Army; Air Marshal, Royal Air Force
 1 January 1935: Admiral, Royal Navy; General, British Army; Air Chief Marshal, Royal Air Force
 21 January 1936: Admiral of the Fleet, Royal Navy; Field Marshal, British Army; Marshal of the Royal Air Force
 3 September 1939: Major-General, British Army

Arms 
Edward's coat of arms as the Prince of Wales was the royal coat of arms of the United Kingdom, differenced with a label of three points argent, with an inescutcheon representing Wales surmounted by a coronet (identical to those of Charles III when he was Prince of Wales). As Sovereign, he bore the royal arms undifferenced. After his abdication, he used the arms again differenced by a label of three points argent, but this time with the centre point bearing an imperial crown.

Ancestry

See also 
 Cultural depictions of Edward VIII and Wallis Simpson
 Abandoned coronation of Edward VIII
 List of prime ministers of Edward VIII

Notes

References

Bibliography 
Bloch, Michael (1982). The Duke of Windsor's War. London: Weidenfeld and Nicolson. .
 Bradford, Sarah (1989). King George VI. London: Weidenfeld and Nicolson. .
 Donaldson, Frances (1974). Edward VIII. London: Weidenfeld and Nicolson. .
 Godfrey, Rupert (editor) (1998). Letters From a Prince: Edward to Mrs Freda Dudley Ward 1918–1921. Little, Brown & Co. .
 Parker, John (1988). King of Fools. New York: St. Martin's Press. .
 Pimlott, Ben (2001). The Queen: Elizabeth II and the Monarchy. London: HarperCollins. .
 Roberts, Andrew; edited by Antonia Fraser (2000). The House of Windsor. London: Cassell and Co. .
 Wheeler-Bennett, Sir John (1958). King George VI. London: Macmillan.
 Williams, Susan (2003). The People's King: The True Story of the Abdication. London: Allen Lane. .
 Windsor, The Duke of (1951). A King's Story. London: Cassell and Co.
 Ziegler, Philip (1991). King Edward VIII: The official biography. New York: Alfred A. Knopf. .

External links 

 
 
 
 Edward VIII at the official website of the British monarchy
 Edward VIII at BBC History

|-

 
1894 births
1972 deaths
19th-century British people
20th-century Bahamian people
20th-century British monarchs
20th-century English memoirists
Abdication of Edward VIII
Alumni of Magdalen College, Oxford
British Army personnel of World War I
British emigrants to France
British field marshals
British governors of the Bahamas
British princes
British royal memoirists
Burials at the Royal Burial Ground, Frogmore
Children of George V
Deaths from cancer in France
Deaths from throat cancer
Dukes created by George VI
Dukes of Cornwall
Dukes of Rothesay
Emperors of India
Freemasons of the United Grand Lodge of England
2
2
Grand Crosses of the Order of the Sun of Peru
Grenadier Guards officers
Heads of state of Australia
Heads of state of Canada
Heads of state of New Zealand
Heirs to the British throne
High Stewards of Scotland
Honorary Fellows of the Royal Society of Edinburgh
House of Windsor
Kings of the Irish Free State
Knights Grand Commander of the Order of the Indian Empire
Knights Grand Commander of the Order of the Star of India
Bailiffs Grand Cross of the Order of St John
Knights of St Patrick
Knights of the Garter
Knights of the Golden Fleece of Spain
Marshals of the Royal Air Force
Members of the King's Privy Council for Canada
Military personnel from Surrey
Monarchs of South Africa
Monarchs of the Isle of Man
Monarchs of the United Kingdom
Monarchs who abdicated
People educated at the Royal Naval College, Osborne
People from Richmond, London
People of the Victorian era
Princes of the United Kingdom
Princes of Wales
Recipients of the Military Cross
Royal Navy admirals of the fleet
Sons of emperors
Sons of kings